The term Internet tutorial can have two different meanings. It can mean a tutorial on the Internet which can have any kind of subject; it may also refer to a tutorial that teaches Internet beginners basic skills on how to use the Internet.

See also
CALL (computer-assisted language learning) (for a more historical perspective)
Distance education
E-learning glossary
Educational technology
Learning management system
M-learning
Online learning
Virtual learning environment

External links
 

Technical communication

Educational technology